The 2012 Copa Chevrolet Montana season was the third Copa Chevrolet Montana season. It began on March 25 at the Interlagos and ended on November 11 at the Brasília, after eight rounds. For 2012 season, the championship have new scoring system.

After nine  drivers became at last round with title chances, Rafael Daniel won for the third time, a new record in category.

Teams and drivers
 All cars are powered by Chevrolet engines and use Chevrolet Montana chassis. All drivers were Brazilian-registered.

Race calendar and results
All races were held in Brazil.

Championship standings
Points were awarded as follows:

Drivers' Championship

Notes
† Eduardo Garcia were eligible for Driver's Championship standings in Curitiba and Brasília.

Teams' Championship

References

External links
 Official website of the Copa Chevrolet Montana

Copa Chevrolet Montana
Stock Car Brasil